Ormiston Sir Stanley Matthews Academy, a.k.a. The school is named after the English footballer Sir Stanley Matthews and is sponsored by Ormiston Academies Trust.

Established in 2010, OSSMA was one of the first schools in Stoke-on-Trent to gain academy status and in January 2013 moved into a brand new building.

Ormiston Sir Stanley Matthews Academy was officially opened in May 2014 by the Duke of Gloucester, KG GCVO.

Since 2014, OSSMA has been oversubscribed, year on year, with applications for Year 7, making it one of the most applied-for non-selective schools in the city.

In 2014, Ormiston Sir Stanley Matthews Academy won the West Midlands region, Pupil Premium Awards and was praised by then, Deputy Prime Minister Nick Clegg on the "fantastic work" that goes on in the academy on a daily basis.

Ormiston Sir Stanley Matthews Academy opens up its facilities to the community during evenings, weekends and holidays, making it "an academy that never sleeps".

Feeder schools
Christchurch CE Primary School
Glebe Primary School 
Heron Cross Primary School 
Newstead Primary School 
The Meadows Primary Academy
Sutherland Primary School

References
OFSTED Report

External links
 

Secondary schools in Stoke-on-Trent
Academies in Stoke-on-Trent
Ormiston Academies